Rosa Cobo Bedía (born 17 December 1956) is a Spanish feminist, writer, and professor of sociology of gender at the University of A Coruña. She is also the director of the Center for Gender Studies and Feminists at the same university. Her main line of research is feminist theory and the sociology of gender.

Early years and education 
Rosa Cobo Bedía was born in Cantabria, 17, December 1956. She graduated with a bachelor's degree in Political Sciences and Sociology in 1981 from the Complutense University of Madrid. She obtained her master's degree in 1983 with the thesis,  El principio de Renaturalización en Jean Jacques Rousseau ("The principle of Renaturalization in Jean Jacques Rousseau"). In 1992, she read her doctoral dissertation on Democracia y Patriarcado en Jean Jacques Rousseau ("Democracy and Patriarchate in Jean Jacques Rousseau"), directed by Dr. Celia Amorós and graduated cum laude with honours.

Career
Cobo was founder and first director of the Interdisciplinary Seminar on Feminist Studies of the University of A Coruña between 2000 and 2003. She also directed the Master program on Gender and Equality Policies from 2005 to 2008. Her main line of research is feminist theory and the sociology of gender. She has been a member of the Advisory Team of the Women and Science Unit (UMYC) of the Ministry of Education in the General Secretariat of Scientific and Technological Policy. In 2008, she was an advisor to the Ministry of Equality. She has taught courses and conferences on gender sociology and feminist theory in Spain and in different countries of Latin America. She directed a project on Prostitution and Public Policies funded by the Institute for Women. She directs the course on the History of Feminist Theory at the University of A Coruña, and a master's degree in Equality and Equity in the Development of Cooperation at the University of Vic - Central University of Catalonia.

Awards
 1997, Cobo won the feminist prize "Carmen de Burgos" for the best published article of that year, granted by the Association of Historical Studies on Women at the University of Malaga.
In 2017, she received the Igualdade Prize "Ernestina Otero" from the Consello Municipal da Muller de Vigo.
In 2018, she received the Comadre de Oro award from the Tertulia Feminista Les Comadres.

Selected works

Books 

 2017: La prostitución en el corazón del capitalismo, Editorial Libros de la Catarata, Madrid
 2011: Hacia una nueva política sexual. Las mujeres ante la reacción patriarcal Editorial Libros de la Catarata, Madrid.
 1995: Fundamentos del patriarcado moderno. Jean Jacques Rousseau Editorial Cátedra, Madrid
 1991: Las mujeres españolas: lo privado y lo público (coautora), Colección ´Estudios y Encuestas´, Centro de Investigaciones Sociológicas, CIS,nº 4.
 1990: Situación social de los viejos en España (coautora), Colección ´Estudios y Encuestas´, Centro de Investigaciones Sociológicas, CIS, nº 21.

Book editions 

 2008: Educar en la ciudadanía. Perspectivas feministas (Ed.) Editorial Libros de la Catarata, col. Mayor, Madrid.
 2006: Interculturalidad, feminismo y educación (Ed.) Editorial Libros de la Catarata, Madrid.

Collective collaborations 

 2014: “¿Prácticas culturales o prácticas patriarcales?”, en Edurne Chocarro de Luis y María del Carmen Sáenz Berceo (eds.) Oriente y occidente: la construcción de la subjetividad femenina,  Universidad de La Rioja.
 2013: “Las políticas de género y el género en la política”, en Capitolina Díaz Martínez y Sandra Dema Moreno (Coord.) Sociología y género, editorial Tecnos
 2010: “Elogio del feminismo (y crítica de los patriarcados contemporáneos)”, en Marián López Fdez. Cao y Luisa Posada Kubissa (Eds.), Pensar con Celia Amorós, ed. Fundamentos, Madrid, Págs. 45–54.
 2009: “Debates teóricos sobre democracia paritaria”, en Gloria Angeles, Franco Rubio y Ana Iriarte Goñi, Nuevas rutas para Clío: el impacto de las teóricas francesas en la historiografía feminista española, Icaria
 2009: “El género en las ciencias sociales”, en Patricia Laurenzo, María Luisa Maqueda y Ana Rubio (Coord.) Género, violencia y derecho, Ediciones del Puerto, Buenos Aires (Argentina).
 2008: “La democracia moderna y la exclusión de las mujeres”, en Fernanda Henriques (coord.), Género, diversidade e cidadanía, Ediçoes Colibrí/NEHM/CIDEHUS-UE, Lisboa.
 2007: “Multiculturalismo y nuevas formas de violencia patriarcal”, en Celia Amorós y Luisa Posada Kubissa (Comp.), Feminismo y multiculturalismo, Ed. Instituto de la Mujer, Colección Debate, Madrid. Pág. 71–84.
 2006: “Izquierda y feminismo: ni juntos ni separados”, en Esperanza Bosch Fiol, Victoria Aurora Ferrer Pérez y Capilla Navarro Guzmán (coord.) Los feminismos como herramientas de cambio social, Universidad de las Islas Baleares
 2005: “Género, feminismo y teoría política” (Coautora). En Eric Herrán (Coord.), Filosofía Política Contemporánea, UNAM (Universidad Nacional Autónoma de México), México.
 2003: “Democracia paritaria y radicalización de la igualdad”. En VV.AA. Seminario “Balance y perspectivas de los estudios de las mujeres y del género”, Ed. Instituto de la Mujer (Ministerio de Trabajo y Asuntos Sociales), Madrid.
 2001: "Algunas reflexiones sobre la identidad política del movimiento feminista", en Amelia Valcárcel y Rosalía Romero (eds.), Pensadoras del Siglo XX, colección Hypatia 2, Instituto Andaluz de la Mujer, Sevilla.
 1998: “Diversidad cultural y multiculturalismo” (Coautora), en Amnistía Internacional, La mutilación genital femenina y los derechos humanos, Madrid, Edai.
 1997: “Las implicaciones políticas del feminismo” (coautora), en Filosofía política I. Ideas políticas y movimientos sociales, (edición de Fernando Quesada) Trotta/CSIC.
 1995: “Género”, en Celia Amorós (Dir.):  Diez palabras clave sobre mujer, Editorial Verbo Divino, Navarra.
 1994: “La construcción social de lo femenino en Mary Wollstonecraft”, en Historia de la Teoría Feminista.  Instituto de Investigaciones Feministas, Universidad Complutense de Madrid/Comunidad Autónoma de Madrid.

Magazine articles 

 2015: “La izquierda y el feminismo", en eldiario.es, 03/02/2015.
 2014: “¿Qué hacer con la prostitución?, en eldiario.es, 11/10/2014.
 2012: “Las paradojas de la igualdad en Jean Jacques Rousseau”, en Avances del Cesor, Universidad de Rosario/CONICET, Rosario, Año IX, nº 9 (Argentina)
 2011: “¿Educación para la libertad?”, en Revista interuniversitaria de formación del profesorado, nº 71.
 2009: “Antinatura”, en Festa da palabra silenciada, nº 25.
 2008: “Patriarcado y feminismo: del dominio a la rebelión”, en El valor de la Palabra. Revista anual de pensamiento. Hacia la ciudadanía del siglo XXI, nº 6. Ed. Fundación Fernando Buesa Blanco, Vitoria/Gasteiz.
 2007: “Discusións en torno ao concepto de patriarcado”, en Festa da palabra silenciada, nº 23.
 2006: “La ética de los cuidados y los tiempos de las mujeres”, en Crítica (Madrid), nº 933, marzo.
 2005: “El género en las ciencias sociales”, en Cuadernos de Trabajo Social.
 2004: “Sexo, democracia y poder político”, en Feminismos (Alicante), nº 3 de junio.
 2002: “Democracia paritaria y sujeto político feminista”, en Anales de la cátedra Francisco Suárez (Granada), nº 36.
 2001: “Feminismo y democracia paritaria”, en El Viejo Topo, (Barcelona), noviembre.
 2000: “Género y teoría social”, en RIS. Revista Internacional de Sociología.
 1998: “Las mujeres en Europa: entre la igualdad y la exclusión”, en Crítica (Madrid), nº 855.
 1997: “Mujeres y ciudadanas”.  En El viejo topo (Barcelona), noviembre.
 1996: “Sociedad, democracia y patriarcado en Jean Jacques Rousseau”, en Papers.  Revista de Sociología (Barcelona), nº 50.
 1995: “La democracia moderna y la exclusión de las mujeres”, en Mientras Tanto (Barcelona).
 1993: “Análisis de género y educación:  raíces de una desigualdad”, en Cuadernos de Cooperación Educativa (Sevilla), nº 3.
 1990: “Mary Wollstonecraft:  un caso de feminismo ilustrado”, en REIS. Revista de Investigaciones Sociológicas, CIS, (Madrid), nº 48.
 1986: “El problema de la renaturalización en Jean Jacques Rousseau”, en REP. Revista de Estudios Políticos, (Madrid), nº 50.

References

External links 

 Entrevista en revista Pueblos (in Spanish)
 Artículos en Ciudad de mujeres (in Spanish)
 Entrevista en conigualdad.org (in Spanish)
 Mujeres en red (in Spanish)
 Femiteca (in Spanish)
 artículo de Gabriela López en Síntesis, Oaxaca (in Spanish)
 Reseña de "Hacia una nueva política sexual", Cristina Justo en Revista de Economía Crítica (in Spanish)
 Reseña de "Hacia una nueva política sexual", De María Candelaria Quispe Ponce en Eunomia. Revista en Cultura de la Legalidad, pag. 239-243 (in Spanish)
 Ponencia sobre la prostitución en nuestro país. Congreso de los Diputados. (in Spanish)
 Interculturalidad en la educación. Video (in Spanish)

Spanish feminists
1956 births
Living people
People from Cantabria
20th-century Spanish writers
20th-century Spanish women writers
21st-century Spanish writers
21st-century Spanish women writers
Complutense University of Madrid alumni
Academic staff of the University of A Coruña